Amanda Davies is an Australian geographer and Senior Lecturer in the Department of Planning and Geography at Curtin University. Together with Samantha Hall, she is set to depart for a mission to Antarctica in December 2016.

References 

Year of birth missing (living people)
Living people
Australian geographers
Academic staff of Curtin University
Women geographers
Women Antarctic scientists
Australian Antarctic scientists